The Adjarians are an ethnographic group of Georgians living mainly in Adjara in south-western Georgia and speaking the Adjarian dialect of the Georgian language.

The Adjarians had their own territorial entity, the Autonomous Republic of Adjara, founded on 16 July 1921 as the Adjara ASSR. After years of post-Soviet stalemate, the region was brought closer within the framework of the Georgian state in 2004, retaining its autonomous status.

Adjarian settlements are also found in the Georgian provinces of Guria, Kvemo Kartli, and Kakheti, as well as in several areas of neighbouring Turkey.

History and Religion

Many Adjarians converted to Islam in the 16th and 17th centuries when the Ottomans ruled over southwestern Georgian lands.

The Georgian population of Adjara had been generally known as Muslim Georgians until the 1926 Soviet census listed them as Adjarians, separate from the rest of Georgians, counting 71,426 of them. In subsequent censuses (1939–1989), they were listed with other Georgians, as no official Soviet census asked about religion. In the 1920s, the suppression of religion and compulsory collectivization led to armed resistance against Communist authorities by Adjarians.

The collapse of the Soviet Union and the re-establishment of Georgian independence accelerated the Christianization of Adjarians, especially among the young. However, a number of Adjarians, particularly in and around Khulo, remain Sunni Muslim. According to census data recently published by the Department of Statistics of Adjara, 54% are Christians, and 39% Muslim.

Language 
The Adjarians speak Adjarian, a Georgian dialect related to the one spoken in the neighbouring northern province of Guria, but with a number of Turkish loanwords. Adjarian also possesses many features in common with the Zan languages (Mingrelian and Laz), which are sisters to Georgian and are included in the Kartvelian language group.

Famous Adjarians
 Emzar Paksadze (b. 1972), famous lawyer from Adjara
 Aslan Abashidze (b. 1938), former leader of the Adjarian Autonomous Republic
 Memed Abashidze (1873–1941), Muslim Georgian politician 
 Rostom Abashidze (b. 1935), Greco-Roman wrestler
 Tbeli Abuserisdze (1190–1240), Georgian writer and scientist
 Niaz Diasamidze (b. 1974), singer and composer
 Nino Katamadze (b. 1972), jazz singer
 Sopho Khalvashi, Georgian singer
 Ahmed-Pasha Khimshiashvili (1781–1836), ruler and military leader under the Ottoman Empire
 Selim Khimshiashvili (1755–1815), ruler under the Ottoman Empire
 Konstantin Meladze (b. 1963), Russian composer
 Valery Meladze (b. 1965), Russian singer
 Zurab Noghaideli (b. 1964), former Prime Minister of Georgia, (2005–2007)
 Ulvi Rajab (1903–1938), Azerbaijani actor
 Levan Varshalomidze (b. 1973), former leader of the Adjarian Autonomous Republic
 Recep Tayyip Erdoğan (b. 1954) President of Turkey
 Lasha Gobadze  (b. 1994) Georgian sport wrestler 
 Shmagi Bolkvadze (b. 1994) Greco-Roman wrestler from Georgia. 
 Amiran Shavadze (b. 1993) Georgian Greco-Roman wrestler
 Nebahat Çehre (b. 1944) Turkish-Georgian actress, model, and singer
 Murat Cemcir (b. 1976) Turkish actor 
 Haidar Abashidze (b. 1966) Georgian politician, journalist, and educator 
 Gürkan Uygun (b. 1974) Turkish actor of Georgian descent
 Beyazıt Öztürk (b. 1969) also known as Beyaz,  Turkish television personality, standup comedian and actor
 Sherip Khimshiashvili (b. January 1833) was a Muslim Georgian nobleman (bey) of the Khimshiashvili from Adjara in the Ottoman service.

See also 
Chveneburi, ethnic Georgians in Turkey many of whom are of Adjarian heritage
Laz people, Kartvelian-speaking ethnic subgroup of Georgians

Notes

References 
Nugzar Mgeladze (Translated by Kevin Tuite). Ajarians. World Culture Encyclopedia. Accessed on 1 September 2007.

Adjara
Islam in Georgia (country)
People from Georgia (country) by ethnic or national origin